Chris Soule (born February 5, 1973) is an American skeleton racer who competed from 1993 to 2006. He won two medals in the men's skeleton event at the FIBT World Championships with a silver in 2003 and a bronze in 1997. Soule also won the overall men's 20023 Skeleton World Cup title with multiple World Cup victories that season. He is the 3-time U.S. National Champion and remains one of the most decorated Skeleton athletes in the history of the sport.

Competing in two Winter Olympic Games, Soule earned his best finish of seventh at Salt Lake City in 2002, during which he was nominated for the Olympic Spirit Award as the U.S. Skeleton Team Captain. He retired after the 2006 Winter Olympics in Turin.

References 
 2002 men's skeleton results
 2006 men's skeleton results
 FIBT profile
 List of men's skeleton World Cup champions since 1987.
 Men's skeleton world championship medalists since 1989
 Official website
 U.S. Olympic committee profile
 World Cup results and brief stats

External links
 

1973 births
American male skeleton racers
Living people
Sportspeople from Connecticut
Skeleton racers at the 2002 Winter Olympics
Skeleton racers at the 2006 Winter Olympics
Olympic skeleton racers of the United States
20th-century American people
21st-century American people